Ternovka is a rural locality (a selo) and the administrative center of Ternovskoye Rural Settlement, Yakovlevsky District, Belgorod Oblast, Russia. The population was 1,340 as of 2010. There are 67 streets.

Geography 
Ternovka is located 12 km southeast of Stroitel (the district's administrative centre) by road. Shopino and Krasny Vostok are the nearest rural localities.

References 

Rural localities in Yakovlevsky District, Belgorod Oblast